As a solo artist, English singer-songwriter Harry Styles has released three studio albums, one extended play (EP), one video album, twelve singles, ten music videos, and one promotional single. Styles' music career began in 2010 as a member of the boy band One Direction. Following the group's indefinite hiatus in 2016, he signed a recording contract with Columbia Records as a solo artist the same year. In April 2017, Styles released his debut single "Sign of the Times". It reached number one on the UK Singles Chart and number four on the US Billboard Hot 100, while also topping the singles chart in Australia; it was certified triple platinum by the Recording Industry Association of America (RIAA), and quadruple platinum by the Australian Recording Industry Association (ARIA).

The following month, Styles released his eponymous debut studio album, which included "Sign of the Times". The album reached number one in Australia, Canada, Ireland, the United Kingdom, and the United States, where it was certified platinum. With over a million copies sold globally, it became one of the best-selling albums of 2017. The other singles from the album were "Two Ghosts" and "Kiwi". In 2018, during Harry Styles: Live on Tour, Styles played two unreleased songs: "Medicine" and "Anna."

In 2019, Styles's second studio album, Fine Line, was preceded by the release of two singles, "Lights Up" and "Adore You", both of which became top-ten hits on several singles charts, including Australia and the United Kingdom. Fine Line, released in December of that year, debuted at number one on the US Billboard 200, recording the highest first-week sales by a British male act in the United States. Styles became the first British male artist to have his first two albums debut atop the Billboard 200. Fine Line was certified platinum by the British Phonographic Industry (BPI) and double platinum by the RIAA. The album spawned four more singles: "Falling", "Watermelon Sugar", "Golden", and "Treat People with Kindness". Its fourth single, "Watermelon Sugar", topped the Billboard Hot 100, becoming Styles's first number one in the United States, and earned multiple multi-platinum certifications, including five times platinum status in Canada.

Styles released his third album, Harry's House, on 20 May 2022. The album has two singles, "As It Was" and "Late Night Talking". "As It Was" topped the Billboard Hot 100 for 15 non-consecutive weeks,  while "Late Night Talking" reached the top 3 in both the UK and US.

Albums

Studio albums

Video albums

Extended plays

Singles

As lead artist

Promotional singles

Other charted and certified songs

Music videos

See also
 List of songs written by Harry Styles
 One Direction discography

Notes

References

External links
 Official website
 Harry Styles at AllMusic
 
 

Discography
Discographies of British artists
Pop music discographies
Rock music discographies